The 100 Most Influential Books Ever Written: The History of Thought from Ancient Times to Today (1998) is a book of intellectual history written by Martin Seymour-Smith, a British poet, critic, and biographer.

The list starts in order with the first ten books: the I Ching (an ancient Chinese divination text), the Hebrew Bible (a version of which serves as the "Old Testament" of the Christian Bible), the Iliad and Odyssey, the Upanishads (a collection of ancient Indian philosophical texts),  the Tao Te Ching,  the Avesta,  the Analects, the History of the Peloponnesian War, the Hippocratic Corpus and the Corpus Aristotelicum.

See also
 List of best-selling books
 Bokklubben World Library

References

External links
The books listed, at "The Greatest Books" website

Books about books
Intellectual history
Top book lists
1998 non-fiction books
British non-fiction books